This page details statistics of the European Cup and Champions League.

General performances

By club

By nation

Some countries ceased to exist during the early 1990s. SC Magdeburg is the only handball club who has won the European club title while representing two different countries (e.g. East Germany and Germany).

Notes
Results until the Dissolution of the Soviet Union in 1991. Three out of five titles were won by clubs from present day Belarus, while two titles and the additional three times runners-up were achieved by clubs from present day Russia.
Results until the Breakup of Yugoslavia in the early 1990s. Clubs from present day Serbia won the title two times and were runners-up additional two times, clubs from present day Croatia won the title once and were runners-up three times, clubs from present day Bosnia and Herzegovina won the title once and were runners-up once, while clubs from present day Slovenia were runners-up one time.
Results until the Dissolution of Czechoslovakia in 1993. Three titles and two times runners-up were all achieved by HC Dukla Prague.

Number of participating clubs of the Champions League era
The following is a list of clubs that have played in or qualified for the Champions League group stages.

Clubs

Performance review (from 1993–present)

By semi-final appearances (European Cup and EHF Champions League)

Note: In the 1994, 1995 and 1996 seasons there were no semi-finals as the finalists qualified via a group stage. The winners (Braga and TEKA Santander in 1994, Zagreb and Bidasoa Irún in 1995, Bidasoa Irún and Barcelona in 1996) and runners-up (Nîmes and UHK West Wien in 1994, TEKA Santander and THW Kiel in 1995, THW Kiel and Pfadi Winterthur in 1996) of the two groups are still marked as semi-finalists in the table.

By quarter-final and semi-final appearances (EHF Champions League)

EHF Champions League Final Four
The history of the EHF Champions League Final Four system, which was permanently introduced in the 2009–10 season.

By season

Performance by club

Countries
 Only on eight occasions has the final of the tournament involved two teams from the same country:
 1996 Spain: Barcelona vs Bidasoa Irún 46–38 (23–15, 23–23)
 2001 Spain: Portland San Antonio vs Barcelona 52–49 (30–24, 22–25)
 2005 Spain: Barcelona vs Ciudad Real 56–55 (27–28, 29–27)
 2006 Spain: Ciudad Real vs Portland San Antonio 62–47 (25–19, 37–28)
 2007 Germany: THW Kiel vs Flensburg-Handewitt 57–55 (28–28, 29–27)
 2011 Spain: Barcelona vs Ciudad Real 27–24
 2014 Germany: Flensburg-Handewitt vs THW Kiel 30–28
 2018 France: Montpellier vs HBC Nantes 32–26
 The country providing the highest number of wins is Germany with 15 victories, shared by eight teams, VfL Gummersbach (5), THW Kiel (3), Frisch Auf Göppingen (2), TV Grosswallstadt (2), Magdeburg (1), HSV Hamburg (1) and Flensburg-Handewitt (1)

See also
EHF Champions League
Women's EHF Champions League

References

External links
Official website

EHF Champions League
Sports records and statistics